Hurt So Good may refer to:

 "It Hurts So Good", a song written by Phillip Mitchell, first recorded in 1971 and covered by Millie Jackson, Susan Cadogan and Jimmy Somerville
 "Hurts So Good", a song by American singer-songwriter John Mellencamp, then performing under the stage name "John Cougar"
 "Hurt So Good" (Carly Rae Jepsen song)
 "Hurts So Good" (Astrid S song)